Ravenstein is a town in the Neckar-Odenwald district, in Baden-Württemberg, Germany. It is situated 19 km northwest of Künzelsau, and 35 km northeast of Heilbronn.

References

Neckar-Odenwald-Kreis